Eduardo Quisumbíng y Argüelles (Filipino: Eduardo Argüelles Quisumbing; November 11, 1895, Santa Cruz, Laguna – August 23, 1986, Quezon City) was a Filipino biologist, a leading authority of plants in the Philippines.

Education
He earned his BSA in Biology at the University of the Philippines Los Baños in  1918, his MS in Botany at the same university in 1921, and Ph.D. in plant taxonomy, systematics and morphology at the University of Chicago in 1923.

Career
From 1920 to 1926 he was attached to the College of Agriculture in U.P., and from 1926 to 1928 to the University of California; in 1928 appointed systematic botanist and since February 1934 acting chief of the Natural Museum Division of the Bureau of Science, Manila, now director of the National Museum. When assigned to the U.S. Navy in Guiuan, at the southern tip of Samar, made collections in that region. He retired as director in November 1961, and was for some following years attached to the Araneta University. Quisumbing undertook restoration of the Herbarium, which was completely destroyed during the war.

Quisumbing was author of taxonomic and morphological papers, many of which deal with orchids, including ‘Medicinal plants in the Philippines’ (Manila 1951). Saccolabium quisumbingii has been named in his honour. He was recipient of the Distinguished Service Star (1954) for outstanding contribution to the field of systematic botany; Diploma of Merit on Orchidology and Fellow Gold Medal, Malaysian Orchid Society (1966); Gold Medal, American Orchid Society (1969), and 1975 PhilAAS Most Outstanding Award.

See also
Camellus

References

External links
DOST – National Academy of Science and Technology at www.nast.dost.gov.ph
QuisumbingE at www.nationaalherbarium.nl

Academic staff of the University of the Philippines
Filipino botanists
People from Laguna (province)
Orchidologists
National Scientists of the Philippines
Recipients of the Distinguished Service Star
1895 births
1986 deaths
Burials at the Libingan ng mga Bayani
University of the Philippines Los Baños alumni
University of California faculty